Los Angeles County+USC Medical Center station is a busway station located in the Boyle Heights neighborhood of Los Angeles, California. It is situated between Union Station and Cal State LA station on the El Monte Busway. The station is served by two bus rapid transit routes: the J Line, operated by Metro and the Silver Streak, operated by Foothill Transit. It is also used by several Metro Express and Foothill Transit bus services, most of which only run during weekday peak periods. The station consists of an island platforms in the center of the El Monte Busway, near its namesake, the Los Angeles County+USC Medical Center. The station was completed on November 4, 1974, and is accessed by a bridge from Pomeroy Avenue between Kingston Avenue and Brittania Street.

Service

Station layout

Hours and frequency 

Silver Streak buses run 24 hours a day between the Montclair Transit Center, El Monte Station, and Downtown Los Angeles. On weekdays, buses operate every 15 minutes most of the day, every 30 minutes during evenings and every hour overnight.

Busway services 
Buses stop at the busway platforms located on the lower freeway level:
Metro J Line: 910, 950
Los Angeles Metro Bus: Express , Express *
Foothill Transit: Silver Streak, *, *, *, *, *, *
* 

Metro route 487 operates all-day, seven days a week; the rest only run during weekday peak periods.

*, *, *, *, *, *

Connections 
There are also several bus routes that stop near the station using bus stops on surface streets:
LADOT DASH: Boyle Heights/East LA, Lincoln Heights/Chinatown

Station Photos

References 

Los Angeles Metro Busway stations
J Line (Los Angeles Metro)
Boyle Heights, Los Angeles
Bus stations in Los Angeles
1973 establishments in California